The Shilka (Evenki: Силькари, Sil'kari; , Shilke; , Shilka) is a river in Zabaykalsky Krai, (Dauria) south-eastern Russia.

The name derives from Evenki shilki 'narrow valley.'

Course
It originates as the confluence of the rivers Onon and Ingoda. Its confluence with the Argun on the Russia-China border gives rise to the Amur. The river is navigable for its entire length. The town Sretensk lies on the Shilka.

Tributaries
The largest tributaries of the Shilka are, from source to mouth:
 Onon (right)
 Ingoda (left)
 Nercha (left)
 Kuenga (left)
 Chacha (left)
 Kara (left)
 Chyornaya (left)

See also
Selenga Highlands
List of rivers of Russia

References

Rivers of Zabaykalsky Krai